Rapala rhoecus is a butterfly in the family Lycaenidae. It was described by Lionel de Nicéville in 1895. It is found in the Indomalayan realm.

Subspecies
Rapala rhoecus rhoecus (Thailand, Malay Peninsula, Sumatra)
Rapala rhoecus vajana Corbet, 1940 (Java)

References

External links
Rapala at Markku Savela's Lepidoptera and Some Other Life Forms

Rapala (butterfly)
Butterflies described in 1895